Theta Pyxidis, Latinized from θ Pyxidis, is a red M-type giant in the constellation Pyxis.  It is approximately 500 ± 30 light years from Earth.  It is of spectral type M1III and semi-regular variable with two measured periods of 13 and 98.3 days, and an average visual magnitude of 4.71,  It shines with a luminosity approximately 970 times that of the Sun and has a surface temperature of 3825 K.  It has a diameter around 54 times that of the Sun.

Theta Pyxidis is moving through the Galaxy at a speed of 22.8 km/s relative to the Sun. Its projected Galactic orbit carries it between 21,200 and 24,700 light years from the center of the Galaxy. It came closest to the Sun 5.8 million years ago when it had brightened to magnitude 3.12 from a distance of 241 light years.

References

M-type giants
Pyxis (constellation)
Pyxidis, Theta
Durchmusterung objects
080874
045902
3718